Malik Ghulam Qasim Hanjra is a Pakistani politician who had been a member of the Provincial Assembly of the Punjab from August 2018 till January 2023.

Political career

He was elected to the Provincial Assembly of the Punjab as a candidate of Pakistan Muslim League (N) from Constituency PP-268 (Muzaffargarh-I) in 2018 Pakistani general election. He has been Chairman of Municipal Committee Dera Din Panah (2015 to 2018). 

He is brother of Malik Ahmad Yar Hunjra (Former minister in punjab). His uncle Malik Sultan Mehmood Hanjra (former MNA) is a well known Politician.

References

Living people
Pakistan Muslim League (N) MPAs (Punjab)
Year of birth missing (living people)
People from Muzaffargarh
Politicians from Muzaffargarh